Gaylon Alcaraz (born October 26, 1966) is an American community organizer and human rights activist in Chicago, Illinois. She is the former executive director of the Chicago Abortion Fund. Her autobiography, Tales of a Woojiehead, was published by Blackgurl Press in 2002.

Education
Alcaraz earned her undergraduate and graduate degrees from DePaul University. She completed one year of coursework at Roosevelt University towards a Doctorate of Education. She is currently attending National Louis University to earn Ph.D. in community psychology.

Career
In 1997, Alcaraz became a founding board member of Affinity Community Services, an organization dedicated to developing leadership skills for black lesbian and bisexual women. In 2011, she joined the board of directors of the Illinois Caucus for Adolescent Health and the Midwest Access Project. Alcaraz was Executive Director of Chicago Abortion Fund from 2005 - 2014.

Awards
 The Chicago Reader Newspaper - The People Issue - "The Activist" - December 2014
SisterSong Women of Color Reproductive Justice Collective - Women Warrior - November 2014
 City of Chicago LGBT Hall of Fame - Inductee - 2013
 NYU Wagner Research Center for Leadership in Action - IGNITE Fellowship - Women of Color in the Social Sector - 2013
 National Organization for Women - Women Who Dared - 2012
 Chicago Foundation for Women - Impact Awards - 2010
 Choice USA - Generational Award - 2009
 National Organization for Women (Chicago Suburban Chapter) - Fay Clayton Award - 2008

References

American feminist writers
American writers of Mexican descent
African-American women writers
American abortion-rights activists
African-American non-fiction writers
American non-fiction writers
Activists for African-American civil rights
Living people
1966 births
People from Chicago
DePaul University alumni
American women non-fiction writers
Women civil rights activists
21st-century African-American people
21st-century African-American women
20th-century African-American people
20th-century African-American women